Krystal Lee is a Jamaican Labour Party politician currently serving as Member of Parliament for Saint Ann North Western. In 2020 general election, she defeated incumbent People's National Party MP Dayton Campbell.

She is an advocate for renovation of Brown's Town.

References 

Living people
21st-century Jamaican women politicians
21st-century Jamaican politicians
Jamaica Labour Party politicians
Members of the House of Representatives of Jamaica
People from Saint Ann Parish
Year of birth missing (living people)
Members of the 14th Parliament of Jamaica